"Don't Be Aggressive" is a 1992 pop song by German singer Sandra. It was written by Michael Cretu and Klaus Hirschburger, and produced by Cretu. The song uses a sample of the 1990 track "Daydreaming" by Massive Attack, which in turn samples "Mambo" (1984) by Wally Badarou. It was released in January 1992 as the lead single from Sandra's fifth studio album Close to Seven, reaching the top 10 in Norway and Finland, and the top 20 in Germany.

The music video for the song was directed by Howard Greenhalgh. The clip was released on Sandra's VHS video compilation 18 Greatest Hits in 1992 and the 2003 DVD The Complete History.

Formats and track listings
CD maxi single
"Don't Be Aggressive" (Radio Edit) – 4:22
"Don't Be Aggressive" (The Midnight Hour Mix) – 6:23
"Seal It Forever" – 4:51

7" single
A. "Don't Be Aggressive" (Radio Edit) – 4:22
B. "Seal It Forever" – 4:51

12" single
A. "Don't Be Aggressive" (The Midnight Hour Mix) – 6:21
B1. "Seal It Forever" – 4:51
B2. "Don't Be Aggressive" (Radio Edit) – 4:22

Charts

References

External links
 "Don't Be Aggressive" at Discogs
 The official Sandra YouTube channel

1992 singles
1992 songs
Sandra (singer) songs
Song recordings produced by Michael Cretu
Songs written by Klaus Hirschburger
Songs written by Michael Cretu
Virgin Records singles
Music videos directed by Howard Greenhalgh